Francis Joseph "Chiz" Guevara Escudero (born October 10, 1969) is a Filipino lawyer and politician serving as a  Senator since 2022, and previously from 2007 to 2019. He recently served as governor of Sorsogon from 2019 to 2022, and was the representative for Sorsogon's 1st district from 1998 to 2007, as well as House Minority Leader from 2004 to 2007. He unsuccessfully ran for vice president of the Philippines in the 2016 elections as the running mate of Grace Poe. 
 
Born to a family of politicians from Sorsogon, he attended the University of the Philippines from kindergarten through law school. Prior to entering politics, he worked as a lawyer and lecturer and earned his Master of Laws degree from Georgetown University in the United States.

Early life
Chiz Escudero was born on October 10, 1969, in Manila, Philippines, the second of the three children of the late Salvador "Sonny" Escudero III, former Agriculture Minister and representative of the first district of Sorsogon during the Marcos era, and Sorsogon representative until his death in 2012. His mother is congresswoman Dr. Evelina B. Guevara-Escudero the representative of the First District of Sorsogon. Chiz Escudero's grandfather, Salvador Escudero Jr., was mayor/Provincial board member of Casiguran, Sorsogon. Chiz Escudero's grand-grandfather, Salvador C. "Gurang" Escudero Sr., entered politics in 1912 as councilor of Casiguran town and went on to become town mayor, provincial board member, and governor. When the Japanese occupation broke out in 1942 he led one of the three guerilla units of the province.

Chiz Escudero was educated in the Philippine public school system. He attended the University of the Philippines Integrated School in elementary (1981) and high school (1985). He obtained his bachelor's degree in political science from the University of the Philippines Diliman (1988) and Bachelor of Laws at the University of the Philippines College of Law (1993).

At the University of the Philippines, Escudero joined the Alpha Phi Beta fraternity and was a member of the Alpha Phi Beta Debating Team, which was the 1991 U.P. Open Debate Champion. A consistent honor student, Escudero was a member of the Order of the Purple Feather or the U.P. Law Honor Society (1989-1993). He became the Secretary General of the Association of Law Students of the Philippines on his senior year at law school (1992-1993).

Prior to becoming a lawyer, Escudero was a teaching assistant at the Department of Political Science, University of the Philippines (1988–1989). In 1989, he became a Junior Political Analyst of the Batangas Development Planning office.

After he received his law degree, Escudero joined the Bautista, Picazo, Buyco, Tan and Fider Law Office in 1993 as junior associate. A year later, he became a legal consultant of the UNLAD Ship Management and Manning Corp. and legal counsel of the Crusade Against Violence (CAV). By 1995, he was a partner at his own firm, the Escudero, Marasigan, Sta. Ana, Vallente and Villareal Law Office (EMSAVIL Law). He remains with the firm to this day.

In 1996, Escudero received his master's degree in International and Comparative Law at the Georgetown University Law Center in Washington, D.C.

Aside from pursuing his law practice, Escudero was senior lecturer at the College of Law at University of the Philippines (1996-1998). He also taught at the Graduate School of the Ateneo de Manila University in 2000.

On July 3, 2000, Escudero was named a Commander of the Philippine Navy Reserve Command.

While serving as a lawmaker, Escudero also dabbled in media. From May to August 2000, he hosted "Ngayon na Pinoy", a TV program on RPN-9. He also anchored the radio programs "Magandang Umaga Bayan" on the Angel Radio, DZAR 1026 AM; and the "Usapang de Campanilla" and "Usapang Legal" both on DZMM.

Escudero also penned a column, "Usapang Legal ni Chiz Escudero" (later renamed "Say Chiz") in two tabloids: Abante and Abante Tonite.

Political career

Congress: 1998–2007
Escudero's involvement in politics started in the 1980s as an organizer for the local campaign of his father. He first expressed interest in running for public office as municipal councilor of Sorsogon when he was 22. At 25, he again indicated his intention to run, this time as mayor of the municipality. However, on both occasions, his family forbade him from entering politics and insisted that he finish his law studies before embarking on a political career. Consequently, Escudero was 28 when he began his political career. He was elected representative of the first district of Sorsogon in 1998 and was one of the youngest lawmakers in the 11th Congress. Escudero was a member of the Nationalist People's Coalition, the second biggest political party in the Philippines, from 1998 to 2009.

He was elected Assistant Majority Floor Leader of the 11th Congress from June 1998 to November 2000 and became Second Deputy Majority Floor Leader from November 2000 to January 2001. He was Assistant Deputy Majority of the 11th Congress from January to June 2001. In his last term as member of the House of Representatives, he served as Minority Floor Leader from 2004 to 2007. While in Congress, Escudero pushed for the cityhood of Sorsogon. On August 16, 2000, Republic Act 8806 was passed, merging the municipalities of Sorsogon and Bacon into a component city of Sorsogon province. The law was ratified during a plebiscite on December 16, 2000, and Sorsogon functioned as a city on June 30, 2001, with the assumption into office of its first officials.

In 2004, Escudero figured prominently in the Philippine presidential elections as the campaign spokesperson of presidential candidate Fernando Poe, Jr., a popular movie actor. Poe eventually lost to the incumbent president Gloria Macapagal Arroyo in a highly contested electoral exercise. When evidence of alleged electoral fraud surfaced, Escudero was among the lawmakers who moved for the impeachment of then President Arroyo. However, the President's allies in Congress voted to drop the impeachment complaint. On September 6, 2005, Escudero voted no on the dropping of impeachment complaints against President Arroyo. He explained,  "It is the truth that has lost. But the search for the truth does not end today. The president and her allies will always be haunted by questions." A new set of impeachment case was filed on 2006 and Escudero maintained his vote against its dismissal. Despite another round of defeat, Escudero said the results "will not change the fact that there was cheating, lying, anomalies and stealing in government."

Escudero belonged to the anti-Charter Change bloc who voted against the constitutional reform  initiatives of then Speaker Jose De Venecia. He believed these attempts to change the Constitution are nothing but last ditch efforts to keep the president and his allies in power.

Escudero was a member of a group of NGO-legislators proposing an alternative national budget called "Imperatives of Real and Equitable Growth: An Alternative Proposal for Financing the Millennium Development Goals in the 2007 Budget". This is in response to the proposed national budget of the administration for not being perceptive to the social development needs of the Philippines.

Senate: 2007–2019

On January 30, 2007, Escudero filed his candidacy for the Senate of the Philippines. He was elected to the Senate with the second highest tally of votes, slightly behind Loren Legarda.

In the 14th Congress of the Philippines, Escudero chaired the Senate Committees on Justice and Human Rights; Ways and Means; and National Defense. In the 15th Congress, he headed the Senate Committee on Justice and Human Rights and the Committee on Environment and Natural Resources. He also led the Joint Oversight Committees on Ecological Solid Waste Management and the Joint Congressional Oversight Committee on the Clean Air Act.

On October 29, 2009, Escudero announced his resignation from the Nationalist People's Coalition and became an independent. Escudero was expected to run for the presidency  but he did not. Instead, he endorsed the team-up of Senator Benigno Aquino III and Makati Mayor Jejomar Binay. The two political figures, who belong to opposing camps, won as President and Vice President, respectively.

On October 2, 2012, Escudero filed for reelection. Prior to the official campaign period, Escudero, Legarda, and Grace Poe were expected to run as common candidates of both the administration and opposition slates. However, the opposition group United Nationalist Alliance junked the three Senate bets. Escudero remained independent but ran as part of the administration-backed coalition Team PNoy. Garnering 17,502,358 votes  out of 40,214,324 registered voters who actually voted, he won another term as senator.

During the initial announcement of Senate chairmanships in the 16th Congress, Escudero got the Education Committee but ended up as chairman of the powerful Finance Committee. Majority Floor Leader Alan Cayetano explained, "Because there was no decision yet on who will be the chairperson of the Committee on Finance, and since it’s one of the biggest committees or one with the largest jurisdiction, traditionally the chairman of the Committee on Finance would not have any other committee. So Senator Escudero graciously gave up the chairmanship of the committee on education because he took over the Committee on Finance."

2016 vice presidential bid

Citing a possible bid for higher office in the next elections, Escudero resigned as chairman of the Senate Committee on Finance and as co-chair of the Joint Congressional Committee on Public Expenditures on July 28, 2015. In his letter to Senate President Franklin Drilon, Escudero wrote, "However, given my public pronouncements regarding a possible candidacy for higher office in 2016, I believe that it behooves me to step down at this juncture to ensure that deliberations on the General Appropriations Bill (GAB) – considered the single most important piece of legislation passed by Congress each year – are untainted by suspicions or perceptions of partisan politics."

Long rumored as the possible running mate of leading presidential candidate Grace Poe, Escudero officially announced his candidacy for Vice President of the Philippines on September 15, 2015, at the historic Club Filipino. In her introduction, Poe enumerated the accomplishments of Escudero as a legislator both in the House and the Senate. said, "It’s true Senator Chiz is my friend, but for the nation, my reason for teaming up with him is personal trust. He is a person who can be trusted, a person who has experience and a person who has already done something for the people."

Presidential frontrunner and Davao City mayor Rodrigo Duterte called the combination of Poe and Escudero as an "excellent" tandem because of his political experience and her ability to provide ascendancy.

A day after his declaration, the Nationalist People's Coalition (NPC) administered the oath-taking of 200 officials from Batangas, Laguna, and Quezon as members in part because of support for the Poe-Escudero ticket. Talks are rife the NPC, in coalition with other political parties including the Nacionalista Party, the National Unity Party, and the Makabayan bloc, will back the Poe-Escudero tandem in the coming elections. Former Philippine Charity Sweepstakes Office board member Florencio Noel revealed, at least eight party-list groups have also expressed support for Poe and Escudero.

In late 2015, Escudero began leading the vice presidential opinion polls, and by February 2016 started being statistically tied with Senator Bongbong Marcos several times, before being beaten by Marcos by early April. Escudero continued to drop in April, maintaining third place behind Marcos and Congresswoman Leni Robredo. A day after the election, on May 10, 2016, Escudero conceded the race, garnering 4.9 million votes and placing fourth among six candidates with 12% of the votes in the unofficial Comelec transparency server count, behind Robredo, Marcos and Senator Alan Peter Cayetano.

Governor of Sorsogon: 2019–2022
Escudero was elected Governor of Sorsogon and executed his duties for one term from June 30, 2019 to June 30, 2022.

Personal life
Escudero married Christine Elizabeth Flores, who is a singer and stage actress, in 1999.  They have two children, fraternal twins, born September 7, 2007. They separated after six years marriage and were granted a civil annulment in 2011. Escudero has custody of their two children.

In 2012, the senator began dating local actress and TV talk show host Heart Evangelista. Their engagement was announced in August 2014, a few months after Escudero obtained Church annulment of his first marriage. On February 15, 2015, Evangelista and Escudero married in Balesin Island, off the coast of Polillo, Quezon.

In May 2018, Evangelista announced that she and Escudero were expecting their first child together. In the same month, however, one of the twins she was carrying was lost to a miscarriage. In June 2018, Evangelista announced that she suffered yet another miscarriage, losing the last of her twins.

Awards
In 1999, Escudero was awarded Youth Achiever in Government; in 2000, Most Outstanding Congressman and Outstanding Public Servant of the Year; and in 2005, he was one of Ten Outstanding Young Men (TOYM) of the Philippines awardees in recognition of his youth leadership.

In 2007, Escudero was the only Filipino named as Asia's News Network's Asia's Idols. In 2008, he was given the Anak TV Seal as the Most Admired TV Personality. He was also honored by the World Economic Forum as a Young Global Leader in the same year in recognition of his professional accomplishments, commitment to society and potential to contribute to shaping the future of the world.

Escudero received the Rotary Golden Wheel Award for Political Governance and Legislation in 2012.

Books
 Orteza, Bibeth. (2009). Say ni Chiz (Autobiography of Senator Francis Escudero). ICatcher Productions, Inc.

References

External links

Senator Francis Escudero's official website
Senator Francis Escudero's official Twitter Page
Fast Facts about Francis "Chiz" Escudero

1969 births
Academic staff of Ateneo de Manila University
Bicolano people
Bicolano politicians
20th-century Filipino lawyers
Georgetown University Law Center alumni
Governors of Sorsogon
Independent politicians in the Philippines
Living people
Members of the House of Representatives of the Philippines from Sorsogon
Nationalist People's Coalition politicians
Senators from Sorsogon
People from Sorsogon
Senators of the 14th Congress of the Philippines
Senators of the 15th Congress of the Philippines
Senators of the 16th Congress of the Philippines
Senators of the 17th Congress of the Philippines
United Opposition (Philippines) politicians
University of the Philippines Diliman alumni
Minority leaders of the House of Representatives of the Philippines
Candidates in the 2016 Philippine vice-presidential election
Senators of the 19th Congress of the Philippines